Mark Lee Kok Huang (born 16 October 1968) is a Singaporean comedian, actor, television host and film director.

Early life
Lee's father was a barber, and his mother was a food and beverage stall assistant. Growing up, Lee would help out in the hawker stall to prepare and sell cooked food, beverages, and chee cheong fun at a hawker centre. Lee was schooled in Jurong Secondary School.

Career
Lee is famous for, amongst others, playing the title role in Singapore's Mediacorp Channel 5 television sitcom Police & Thief as Lee Tok Kong, Phua Chu Kang Pte Ltd as guest appearance Lee Kok Peng from season 5 until season 7 and in Mediacorp Channel 8 long series television drama Holland V as Su Hao. He also gained recognition for his work with Jack Neo and Henry Thia in movies such as Money No Enough, That One No Enough, Money No Enough 2 and Where Got Ghost?. The trio also appeared alongside one another in the long-running comedy variety programme named Comedy Nite (搞笑行动). He made his directorial debut in the comedy horror film The Ghosts Must Be Crazy.

Along with long-time colleague Christopher Lee, Mark Lee was awarded the All Time Favourite Artiste award in the Star Awards 2010 and became the first host-cum-comedian to win the award as the previous winners were predominantly thespians. As such he will no longer be in the run for the Top 10 Most Popular Male Artistes awards in future Star Awards.

Although Lee was mostly known for playing comedic roles early in his career, he has also diversified into hosting and hosted various kinds of programmes, mainly infotainment, travelogue and DIY programmes. He co-hosted the popular home makeover programme Home Decor Survivor and the infotainment programme Behind Every Job with Bryan Wong, which won both a string of nominations in the hosting categories at the Star Awards. In 2012 he won his fourth Best Variety Host award for his popular show It's a Small World (season 2).

Lee was always given an on-screen name/surname of Ong or Huang, particularly in Jack Neo's movies, with the exception of That One No Enough, I Not Stupid, Homerun, I Do, I Do, Ah Long Pte Ltd, Love Matters, Being Human and in the Long Long Time Ago and The Diam Diam Era movies.

On 9 March 2017, Lee opened a production house named King Kong Media Productions. with partner Yinson Marine Services, a Malaysian oil and gas company.

In November 2021, Lee's comedy Number 1, for which he was nominated for the Best Leading Actor award at the Golden Horse Awards, started streaming on Disney+. The movie is listed under the Asian Spotlight section of Disney+. It is significant for the Singapore film scene as it is one of the few Singaporean works to be streamed on Disney+.

Personal life
Lee is married to Catherine Ng. They have 2 daughters and a son.

Filmography

Film

Television

Variety show

Awards and nominations

References

External links 
 

1968 births
Living people
Singaporean Taoists
People from Johor Bahru
Singaporean male television actors
Singaporean people of Hokkien descent
Singaporean male film actors
Singaporean television personalities
Singaporean film directors
20th-century Singaporean male actors
21st-century Singaporean male actors